Roger David Verdon Knight  (born 6 September 1946) is an English administrator, cricketer and schoolmaster. He was awarded the OBE in 2007. He is an Honorary Life Member of the Marylebone Cricket Club (MCC) and was President of the club from 2015 to 2016.

Background
He was born in Streatham, the son of the late David Verdon Knight, who was himself both an Old Alleynian and a graduate of St Catharine's College, Cambridge, and the late Thelma Patricia Knight. D.V. Knight was a master at Dulwich College where he was also the head of the junior boarding house Bell House.

Education
He was educated at Dulwich College and at St Catharine's College, Cambridge. He read Modern and Medieval Languages, earning a BA in 1969, MA in 1972 and a DipEd in 1971.

First-Class Cricket Career
He played first-class cricket for: 
Cambridge University Cricket Club (blue) (1967–1970)
Surrey County Cricket Club (1968–1970) and (1978–1984) (Captain 1978–1983)
Gloucestershire County Cricket Club (1971–1975)
Sussex County Cricket Club (1976–1977)

Teaching career
Assistant Master at Eastbourne College  (1970–1978)
Assistant Master at Dulwich College  (1978–1983)
Housemaster at Cranleigh School  (1983–1990)
Headmaster of Worksop College (1990–1993)

Administrative Appointments
Surrey County Cricket Club Cricket Committee (1984–1987)
Vice Chairman of the South East Region of the Sports Council (1985–1990)
Governor of the TVS Trust (1987–1992)
MCC Committee (1989–1992)
HMC Sports sub-committee (1991–1993)
Secretary of Marylebone Cricket Club (MCC) (1994–2000)
President of the European Cricket Federation (1994–1997)
Governor of Rendcomb College (1995–1999)
ECB Management Board (1997–2006)
Governor of King's School, Taunton (1998 to date)
Chairman of Education Committee (The King's Schools, Taunton) (2004 to date)
Councillor of the London Playing Fields Society (1998–2002)
Secretary & Chief Executive of Marylebone Cricket Club (MCC) (2000–2006)
Governor of Dulwich College (2004 to date)
Chairman of the European Cricket Council (2006 to date)
Chairman of the Board of the ECB Association of Cricket Officials (2008 to date)
President of Surrey County Cricket Club (2008–2009)
President of Marylebone Cricket Club (2015–2016)

Recreations
Cricket, tennis, bridge, piano music, 17th century French Literature

Notes

External links
Cricinfo
Cricket Archive

English cricketers
English cricket administrators
Minor Counties cricketers
Bedfordshire cricketers
Cambridge University cricketers
Gloucestershire cricketers
Surrey cricketers
Surrey cricket captains
Presidents of Surrey County Cricket Club
Sussex cricketers
Schoolteachers from London
People educated at Dulwich College
Presidents of the Marylebone Cricket Club
Secretaries of the Marylebone Cricket Club
Alumni of St Catharine's College, Cambridge
Officers of the Order of the British Empire
1946 births
Living people
Marylebone Cricket Club cricketers
Oxford and Cambridge Universities cricketers
D. H. Robins' XI cricketers
Schoolteachers from Nottinghamshire
Schoolteachers from Surrey